Majordomo is a mailing list manager (MLM) developed by Brent Chapman. It is written in Perl and works in conjunction with sendmail on UNIX and related operating systems. The name majordomo is derived from the Latin "major domus" meaning "master of the house"; in English,  the word is used to refer to a large household's chief servant. 

The current version of Majordomo is 1.94.5, released 19 January 2000.

The official website warns that it will not work with Perl versions 5.001 and 5.005_01 specifically. It recommends to use Perl 4.036 or the latest version available. Support for Perl 4.036 may not be kept for the future.

History 
With the advent of email, many mailing lists were maintained manually, with a list owner adding and removing participants by editing a text file. In 1984, LISTSERV was developed to run on IBM VM mainframes, and automated mailing lists on a large scale.

Most mailing lists moved to commercial mailing list hosting services, often with a stipend of $100 or more paid to the list owner by the hosting service in exchange for the transfer. Most of those hosting providers were subsequently bought out by Yahoo!, and merged into its Yahoo! Groups service.

Majordomo has been in widespread use since 1992, predating the popularity of the web browser, in an era when many people had access to email but the World Wide Web did not enjoy wide deployment. As a result, tasks such as subscribing and unsubscribing are only handled by sending mail messages. 

There are front-ends, such as MajorCool, to provide a web interface. Many mailing lists still use Majordomo.

Majordomo 2 
As of 18 May 2004, there was work being done to completely rewrite Majordomo with a focus on keeping the familiar email interface while greatly improving the web interface and other features. This coding effort is referred to as Majordomo 2 and is being used by the OpenBSD project.

Licensing 
Majordomo is community-supported source available software; the license states "No part of Majordomo may be incorporated into any program or other product that is sold, or for which any revenue is received without written permission of Great Circle Associates". There are a few exceptions listed in the license to this: "You may install Majordomo at your site and run mailing lists for other (sic) using it, and charge for that service. You may install Majordomo at other sites, and charge for your time to install, configure, customize, and manage it. You may charge for enhancements you've made to the Majordomo software, subject to the distribution restrictions listed [in the license]. You may not charge for the Majordomo software itself".

See also 
 LISTSERV
 GNU Mailman
 ezmlm

References

External links 
 
 Majordomo FAQ
 Majordomo Newsletters for the Novice
 Majordomo 2

Perl software
Mailing list software
Computer-related introductions in 1992
Mailing list software for Linux